Confédération africaine des travailleurs croyants (French for 'African Confederation of Believing Workers') may refer to:
The West African Confédération africaine des travailleurs croyants
The Central African Confédération africaine des travailleurs croyants
The Congolese Confédération africaine des travailleurs croyants, and other organizations that emerged from the two regional CATCs.